Serdar Saatçı (14 February 2003) is a Turkish professional footballer who plays as a centre-back for Primeira Liga club Braga.

Career
Saatçı started his career at Istanbul-based club Bayrampaşaspor in the TFF Third League. He joined Beşiktaş J.K. in 2014, where he played at various youth levels until 2020. He signed a professional contract with Beşiktaş on 27 February 2020. He was on the bench as an unused substitute player in 2021 Turkish Cup final, won by Beşiktaş 2–0 on 18 May 2021. Saatçı made his Süper Lig debut on week 7 of 2021–22 Süper Lig season against Altay S.K., on 24 September 2021.

On 12 July 2022, Saatçı was dropped from the senior team by the club following "behavioural issues" during a friendly game against Viktoria Plzeň as part of Beşiktaş' pre-season camp in Austria. He continued training individually in Ümraniye Nevzat Demir Facilities in Istanbul.

Career statistics

Honours
Süper Lig: 2020–21
Turkish Cup: 2020–21
Turkish Super Cup: 2021

References

External links
 
 

2003 births
Living people
Footballers from Istanbul
Association football defenders
Beşiktaş J.K. footballers
S.C. Braga players
Süper Lig players
Primeira Liga players
Turkish footballers
Turkish expatriate footballers
Turkish expatriate sportspeople in Portugal
Expatriate footballers in Portugal